Dalvey is a settlement in Jamaica.

References

Populated places in Saint Thomas Parish, Jamaica